The 1878 Columbia football team represented Columbia University in the 1878 college football season.

Schedule

References

Columbia
Columbia Lions football seasons
College football winless seasons
College football undefeated seasons
Columbia football